The church of St. Gerard Majella is a church of Rome in Prenestino-Labicano district, in Via Romolo Balzani.

History

It was built between 1980 and 1981 by the architect Aldo Aloysi, and was consecrated 25 March 1982 by Cardinal Ugo Poletti.

The church is home parish, established 20 April 1978 by Cardinal Ugo Poletti Vicar with the decree His Holiness. It is home to the cardinal's title of "St. Gerard Majella", instituted by Pope John Paul II 26 November 1994.

List of Cardinal Protectors
 Kazimierz Świątek (24 November 1994 – 21 July 2011)
 Ruben Salazar Gomez (24 November 2012 – present)

References

External links
 San Gerardo Maiella 

Titular churches
Rome Q. VII Prenestino-Labicano
Roman Catholic churches completed in 1981
20th-century Roman Catholic church buildings in Italy